Haven High Academy (formerly Haven High Technology College and Haven High School) is a secondary school with academy status located on Marian Road in the north of Boston, Lincolnshire, England.

The school came into being in September 1992 as the result of a merger of the then Kitwood Girls School and Kitwood Boys School.

References

External links 
 Haven High Academy official website

Secondary schools in Lincolnshire
Schools in Boston, Lincolnshire
Academies in Lincolnshire
Educational institutions established in 1992
1992 establishments in England